Elgg is a municipality in the district of Winterthur in the canton of Zürich in Switzerland. On 1 January 2018 the former municipality of Hofstetten merged into the municipality of Elgg.

History

Elgg is first mentioned between 760 and 763  as Ailaghoga.  In 1166 it was mentioned as Elgoue and in 1370 as Elggaw.

Äschli (Ash Wednesday custom)
Äachli, or in English Ash Wednesday custom, is a 500-year-old custom, which takes place on Ash Wednesday with the boys parade as its annual highlight. The origin lies in the pre-Reformation period, when musters were conducted for Elgg's Militia or mercenaries. The exact origin is unknown. However, it is mentioned in the 1628 parish priest Fasi book that the boys' parade in Elgg is a very old custom.

Aschermittwoch-Gesellschaft, which was founded in 1914 and currently has around 650 members, has committed themselves to this tradition.

Every year on New Year's young and old gathered at the Ober Tor, where the boys of Elgg, age 5-16, select in an open vote the respective Äschlihauptmann and the entire company.

From New Year until Ash Wednesday, exercises are then alternately held on Saturdays and Sundays.

Geography
Of this area, 45.6% is used for agricultural purposes, while 41.6% is forested. Of the rest of the land, 12.3% is settled (buildings or roads) and the remainder (0.6%) is non-productive (rivers, glaciers or mountains).   housing and buildings made up 8% of the total area, while transportation infrastructure made up the rest (4.3%). Of the total unproductive area, water (streams and lakes) made up 0.3% of the area.   7.9% of the total municipal area was undergoing some type of construction.

The village is overlooked by Elgg Castle, which is a Swiss heritage site of national significance.

Demographics
, 12.8% of the population was made up of foreign nationals.   the gender distribution of the population was 49.7% male and 50.3% female. Over the last 10 years the population has grown at a rate of 4.7%. Most of the population speaks German (90.8%), with Albanian being second most common (3.0%) and Italian being third (2.3%).

In the 2007 election the most popular party was the SVP which received 39.4% of the vote.  The next three most popular parties were the SPS (16.8%), the CSP (12.8%) and the FDP (11%).

The age distribution of the population is children and teenagers (0–19 years old) make up 24.7% of the population, while adults (20–64 years old) make up 59.6% and seniors (over 64 years old) make up 15.7%. In Elgg about 79.1% of the population (between age 25-64) have completed either non-mandatory upper secondary education or additional higher education (either university or a Fachhochschule).  There are 1502 households in Elgg.

Elgg has an unemployment rate of 1.98%.  , there were 104 people employed in the primary economic sector and about 30 businesses involved in this sector.  471 people are employed in the secondary sector and there are 46 businesses in this sector.  742 people are employed in the tertiary sector, with 112 businesses in this sector.   48.8% of the working population were employed full-time, and 51.2% were employed part-time.

 there were 825 Catholics and 1959 Protestants in Elgg. In the 2000 census, religion was broken down into several smaller categories. Of the rest of the population, 0% were Muslim, 6.9% belonged to another religion (not listed), 3.5% did not give a religion, and 8.7% were atheist or agnostic.

The historical population is given in the following table:

Transport 
Elgg railway station is a stop of the Zürich S-Bahn on the line S35.

Notable people 
 Heinrich Schweizer-Sidler (1815 in Elgg – 1894) a Swiss philologist
 Bruno Wolfer (born 1954 in Elgg) a Swiss former cyclist
 Jacqueline Fehr (born 1963) a Swiss politician, sits on the Swiss National Council, brought up in Elgg

References

External links 

  
 

Cities in Switzerland
Municipalities of the canton of Zürich